Wide Right may refer to:

Wide Right (Buffalo Bills), Scott Norwood's miss in Super Bowl XXV
Wide Right I, a missed field goal by the Florida State University Seminoles in their 1991 game against the University of Miami Hurricanes
Wide Right II, a missed field goal by the Florida State University Seminoles in their 1992 game against the University of Miami Hurricanes
Midfielder, association football position often referred to as a winger